Leddy is a surname. Notable people with the surname include:

Bernard Joseph Leddy (1910–1972), United States federal judge
Bruce Leddy, writer, director, and producer currently living in Los Angeles
Francis Leddy OC, Ph.D. (1911–1998), Canadian academic and President of the University of Windsor from 1964 to 1978
James P. Leddy (born 1942), Democratic member of the Vermont State Senate, who represented the Chittenden senate district
John M. Leddy (1914–1997), official in the United States Department of State, who mainly focused on U.S. trade policy
Mary Jo Leddy, CM (born 1946), Canadian writer, speaker, theologian and social activist
Nick Leddy (born 1991), American professional ice hockey defenseman, currently playing with the New York Islanders organization
Robert Leddy, provincial politician from Alberta, Canada